is a Japanese footballer who plays as a midfielder for Zakynthos.

Career 

In 2016, Konagaya signed for Australian third division side Saints. In 2016, he signed for Bunbury United in the Australian fifth division. In 2018, he signed for Australian second division club Port Melbourne Sharks. In 2020, Konagaya signed for Zakynthos in the Greek second division.

References

External links

 

Association football midfielders
Living people
Expatriate footballers in Greece
1993 births
Japanese expatriate sportspeople in Australia
Port Melbourne SC players
St George FC players
A.P.S. Zakynthos players
Super League Greece 2 players
Japanese expatriate sportspeople in Greece
Japanese expatriate footballers
Expatriate soccer players in Australia
Japanese footballers